Alice Leigh-Smith (née Prebil), born September 11, 1907, was a Croatian born nuclear physicist. She is best known for being the first woman in British history to receive a PhD in nuclear physics. Additionally, she is remembered for her pioneering research in cancer and for her attempts in the discovery of an elusive element, Element 85.

Professional life 

At the age of 25 in 1932, Prebil began working at the Radium Institute in Paris under the tutelage of Marie Curie. Three years later, in 1935, at the age of 28, she would become the first woman in Great Britain to receive a PhD in nuclear physics. It is accepted that Leigh-Smith defended her thesis in London, however it is currently unknown from what university she was granted her degree.

Dr. Alice Leigh-Smith was also involved in the use of radioactive substances as a treatment for cancer. From 1936, she conducted cancer research as part of the British Empire cancer campaign. From 1938 to 1940, during the Second World War, Alice Leigh-Smith was at the University of Bern in Switzerland, where she continued her work. In January 1943, the anticipation of results from her study regarding the treatment of cancer with radioactive substances was published in the London Times. However, no results are available for current analysis.

In 1942, Leigh-Smith and a Swiss chemist, Walter Minder jointly announced the discovery of element 85 (now called astatine) in 1942. They proposed the name anglohelvetium for the new element, in order to honor both of their home countries- "anglo" for Leigh-Smith's England and "Helvetia" after the personification of Minder's country- Switzerland. This was Minder's second attempt at discovering the element. It was later proven that Walter Minder and Alice Leigh-Smith had not discovered element 85, after the failure of their results to be replicable.

Personal life 

In 1933, at the age of 26, she married Philip Leigh-Smith, a British diplomat and son of the Arctic explorer Benjamin Leigh-Smith. His published comedy, "Ladies in Diplomacy" is purportedly based on the adventures of his wife, Alice.

Alice Leigh-Smith, had one child by her husband Philip Leigh-Smith. Christopher Leigh-Smith was Alice's only child and is alive today, acting as an entrepreneur based in Switzerland.

Legacy 

Currently, a portion of Alice Leigh-Smith's private archives are in the possession of the Curie Institute for the Curie Museum. The records are accessible by appointment only.

References

Benjamin Leigh-Smith Arctic Explorer Image of Alice Leigh-Smith

English physicists
English nuclear physicists
English women physicists
1907 births
1987 deaths
Women nuclear physicists